Zeus (November 22, 2008 – September 3, 2014) was a Great Dane from Otsego, Michigan, United States, famous for being named the "world's tallest dog" by the 2012 and 2013 Guinness Book of World Records.

Description

Death
On September 11, 2014, Zeus' owner, Kevin Doorlag, announced that he had died on September 3, with symptoms of old age.

See also
 List of individual dogs

References 

2008 animal births
2014 animal deaths
Individual dogs in the United States
D